Ryan Raposo (born March 5, 1999) is a Canadian professional soccer player who plays as a winger for Vancouver Whitecaps FC in Major League Soccer.

Youth 
Born in Hamilton to a Portuguese father and Chinese mother, Raposo began playing soccer at a young age, making his first competitive rep team when he was eight with Mount Hamilton SC. When he was 11, he joined the Toronto FC Academy, but the club released him two years later, believing him to be "too small and too skinny". Afterwards, he joined the Burlington Youth SC at age 12, joining the provincial program at age 14. Soon after, he was selected to play on the Canadian under-15 national team. When he was 16, he moved to Vaughan SC. In 2016, he fractured his right fibula in a club match against Sigma FC. He was named MVP at the 2017 Canada Summer Games, as part of the gold medal-winning Team Ontario.

Raposo attended Syracuse University, where he played soccer for two years. In his second and final year, Raposo led his team in goals (15) and points (37), which set the school records for a sophomore, and earned a spot in the All-ACC first team.

Club career 
During college, Raposo also appeared for League1 Ontario side Vaughan Azzurri in the 2017, 2018 and 2019 during the NCAA offseason. He played in the 2019 Canadian Championship and scored in the first leg of their tie, which was lost on away goals to Canadian Premier League club HFX Wanderers FC.

On January 9, 2020, Raposo was selected fourth overall by Vancouver Whitecaps FC in the 2020 MLS SuperDraft, and was signed by the club to a Generation Adidas contract. He made his debut on March 7, 2020, coming on as a substitute in the 67th minute, against the Los Angeles Galaxy, recording an assist on the only goal of the game.

International career
Eligible for Canada, China, Portugal.

He joined the Canadian under-15 in 2014, playing matches against Costa Rican teams.

Raposo was named to the Canadian under-23 roster for the 2020 CONCACAF Men's Olympic Qualifying Championship on March 10, 2021.

Style of play 
Described as "a skilful winger" by Neil Davidson, Raposo is also capable of playing as a number ten. His former Syracuse coach Ian McIntyre labelled him a "dynamic, exciting attacker who can torment defenders."

Honours

Vancouver Whitecaps
 Canadian Championship: 2022

 Individual 
 Canadian Championship - Best Young Canadian Player Award: 2022

Career statistics

References

External links
 

1999 births
Association football forwards
Canadian soccer players
Living people
Major League Soccer players
Soccer players from Hamilton, Ontario
Syracuse Orange men's soccer players
Vancouver Whitecaps FC draft picks
Vancouver Whitecaps FC players
Canadian sportspeople of Chinese descent
Canadian people of Portuguese descent
Vaughan Azzurri players
Burlington SC (League1 Ontario) players